Firuziyeh (also Romanized as Fīrūzīyeh; also known as Kalāteh-ye Fīrūzīyeh) is a village in Daman Kuh Rural District, in the Central District of Esfarayen County, North Khorasan Province, Iran. At the 2006 census, its population was 138, in 34 families.

References 

Populated places in Esfarayen County